Pine Ridge is a census-designated place located in Lehman Township, Pike County in the state of Pennsylvania. The community is located near U.S. Route 209 close to the New Jersey line. Pine Ridge is just to the south and shares a northern border with another CDP, Pocono Mountain Lake Estates. As of the 2010 census, the population of Pine Ridge was 2,707 residents.

Demographics

References

Census-designated places in Pike County, Pennsylvania
Census-designated places in Pennsylvania